Santa Barbara School of the Arts was a college of art founded in Santa Barbara, California, by artist Fernand Lungren (1857–1932) in 1920. Faculty members included Edward Borein, who taught etching, and John Marshall Gamble (1863 – 1957), who also served as President of the School Board. The school closed in 1933.

References 

1920 establishments in California
1933 disestablishments in California
Art schools in California
Buildings and structures in Santa Barbara, California
Educational institutions established in 1920
Educational institutions disestablished in 1933